The 1998 'Friendship Cup' , also known as the 1998 Sahara 'Friendship Cup'  for sponsorship reasons, was a One Day International cricket series which took place between 12 and 20 September 1998.   The tournament was held in Canada, which was seen as perfect neutral territory for India and Pakistan to play each other. The tournament was won by Pakistan, who won the series 4–1.

Teams

Squads

Fixtures

ODI series

1st ODI

2nd ODI

3rd ODI

4th ODI

5th ODI

Statistics

References

External links
 Sahara 'Friendship' Cup 1998 at ESPNcricinfo
 

1998 in Canadian cricket
International cricket competitions from 1997–98 to 2000
Cricket in Canada